The Eastern Orthodox Metropolitanate of Hong Kong and Southeast Asia is an Eastern Orthodox diocese of the Ecumenical Patriarchate of Constantinople. It is centred in Hong Kong and has jurisdiction over Eastern Orthodox Christians in Southeast Asia. It was established in November 1996 by decision of the Holy Great Synod of Constantinople.

History

For some years, a small band of Eastern Orthodox Christians kept Eastern Orthodoxy prevalent in Hong Kong; while services with a priest were rare, they continued to live the ancient expression of Eastern Orthodox Christianity. A small delegation, representing the St. Luke Orthodox Community, approached Patriarch Bartholomew I of Constantinople, requesting that the community be given a full-time clergyman, who could serve the needs of the faithful and offer Orthodox Christianity to the local people. With the efforts of the then Bishop Athenagoras (later Metropolitan of Mexico, Central America and Caribbean, with seat in Panama), a systematic plan was developed. Upon the research and advice of the Bishop, the Holy and Sacred Synod of Constantinople founded the new Orthodox Metropolitanate of Hong Kong and South East Asia in November 1996, with jurisdiction over: Hong Kong, Macao, China, Taiwan, Mongolia, Philippines, Vietnam, Cambodia, Laos, Thailand, Myanmar and also Singapore, Indonesia, Malaysia, Brunei, East Timor, Maldives, Sri Lanka, Bangladesh, India, Nepal, Pakistan and Afghanistan.

On December 2, 1996, Archmandrite Nikitas (Lulias) was elected as the first Orthodox Metropolitan of Hong Kong and assigned the ecclesiastical responsibilities of Southeast Asia. On January 12, 1997, the Enthronement of Nikitas Lulias as the first Metropolitan of the OMHKSEA took place. The ceremony was held at the Orthodox Cathedral of St. Luke, Stanley Fort, Hong Kong, with Metropolitan Athenagoras of Panama representing the Ecumenical Patriarchate.

Ten years later, in August 2007, Metropolitan Nikitas was transferred as Metropolitan of Dardanellia and OMHKSEA stayed vacant for a few months. On January 9, 2008, the Holy and Sacred Synod of the Ecumenical Patriarchate took the decision to split the huge area of OMHKSEA, by creating a new Metropolitanate of Singapore and South Asia, with jurisdiction over Singapore, Indonesia, Malaysia, Brunei, East Timor, Maldives, Sri Lanka, Bangladesh, India, Nepal, Pakistan and Afghanistan. Under the jurisdiction of the Metropolitanate of Hong Kong remained: Hong Kong, Macao, China, Taiwan, Mongolia, Philippines, Vietnam, Cambodia, Laos, Thailand and Myanmar. With the same decision, Archimandrite Nektarios (Tsilis) was elected as the New Metropolitan of OMHKSEA. His ordination took place on January 20, 2008, in the patriarchal St George Holy Church of the Ecumenical Patriarchate in Phanar, Constantinople (Istanbul), Turkey, and his enthronement took place on March 1, 2008, in the Orthodox Cathedral of St. Luke, Stanley Fort, Hong Kong. The Davao parish first opened in 2018 as a recent addition to the OMHKSEA.

See also
 Christianity in Hong Kong
 Exarchate of the Philippines
 Eastern Orthodox Church
Patriarchal Exarchate in South-East Asia (Moscow Patriarchate) – an exarchate of the Russian Orthodox Church

References

Bibliography

External links
 Official Site - Orthodox Metropolitanate of Hong Kong and Southeast Asia
 AsiaNews: Nektarios is the new Orthodox bishop of Hong Kong

Hong Kong
Eastern Orthodoxy in Hong Kong
Churches in Hong Kong
Eastern Orthodox dioceses in Asia